Tamsia is a monotypic moth genus in the family Erebidae described by Roepke in 1938. Its only species, Tamsia hieroglyphica, was first described by Swinhoe in 1902. It is found on the Indonesian island of Sulawesi.

References

Tinoliinae
Monotypic moth genera